Rhododendron macrophyllum, the Pacific rhododendron, California rosebay, California rhododendron, coast rhododendron or big leaf rhododendron, is a large-leaved species of Rhododendron native to the Pacific Coast of North America. It is the state flower of Washington.

Description 

Distribution 
The northern limit of its range is somewhat north of the border between Canada and the United States in British Columbia. It is found as far south as Monterey Bay in California. It is widely distributed in the Coast Mountains and Cascade Range. It is less abundant in the coastal mountains of Washington and northern Oregon and more common south of the Siuslaw River. It is mostly coastal in distribution but extends its range eastward to locations in the Cascade Mountains in Oregon, Washington and British Columbia.

Habitat 
Rhododendron macrophyllum, like many rhododendrons, thrives in disturbed habitats such as roadside embankments and recently deforested wildlands. They can also live up in the mountains. It also grows in coastal and montane conifer woods.

History and cultivation 
Archibald Menzies found R. macrophyllum growing along with Arbutus menziesii in May 1792 when he and George Vancouver made their second landfall after leaving Hawaii, near present-day Port Discovery, Washington. Seed was sent to England in 1850 by William Lobb.

In recent years it has been the main focus of a study group at the Rhododendron Species Foundation in Federal Way, Washington, the Western North American Rhododendron Species Project. The WNARSP is documenting the detailed range and forms of all of the western North American rhododendron species.

Toxicity 
The species contains andromedotoxin, which can poison the honey of nearby hives.

References

Other sources 
Davidian, H. H. The Rhododendron Species, Volume III – Elepidotes continued. 1992.  Timber Press.  .
Cox, Peter A. & Kenneth N.E. The Encyclopedia of Rhododendron Species. 1997. Glendoick Publishing. .

External links 
 
 

macrophyllum
Flora of the Western United States
Garden plants of North America
Symbols of Washington (state)
Flora without expected TNC conservation status